Huawei Ascend Y300 is a smartphone that was designed and marketed by Huawei Technologies Co. Ltd. Huawei uses Android & 
Firefox OS for the smartphone

It initially ran the Android 4.1.1 (Jelly Bean) operating system. It has a 1 GHz Dual Core Cortex-A5 proArenar with 4GB internal storage with 1.09GB available for the user and 512MB (Shared with GPU 119MB) of RAM memory. The phone also has a 4.0 inch 480 x 800 pixels, (~233 ppi pixel density) LCD display and a 5.0MP auto focus rear camera 2592 х 1944 pixels with LED Flash and 0.3(VGA) front camera.

References

Huawei smartphones
Y300
Mobile phones introduced in 2013
Discontinued smartphones